Hymenomima is a genus of moths in the family Geometridae described by Warren in 1895.

Species
Hymenomima amberia Schaus, 1901
Hymenomima arthura Schaus, 1901
Hymenomima camerata Warren, 1900
Hymenomima canidentata Dognin, 1902
Hymenomima carneata Warren, 1904
Hymenomima cindica Warren, 1897
Hymenomima cogigaria Möschler, 1882
Hymenomima conia Prout, 1931
Hymenomima costilla Dognin, 1895
Hymenomima dogninana Dyar, 1916
Hymenomima extersaria Warren, 1897
Hymenomima franckia Schaus, 1897
Hymenomima macaria Schaus, 1901
Hymenomima mediorasa Dognin, 1909
Hymenomima memor Warren, 1906
Hymenomima minuta Warren, 1897
Hymenomima nephalia Druce, 1892
Hymenomima nivacaria E. D. Jones, 1921
Hymenomima nortonia Schaus, 1898
Hymenomima occulta Schaus, 1901
Hymenomima perfuscimargo Prout, 1910
Hymenomima pristes Prout, 1933
Hymenomima rufata Warren, 1904
Hymenomima semialba Warren, 1897
Hymenomima seriata Prout, 1933
Hymenomima subnigrata Warren, 1906
Hymenomima tharpoides Dognin, 1914
Hymenomima umbelularia Hübner, [1825]

References

Boarmiini